St Mary's Church is a Syro-Malabar parish church in Cheloor/Edathirinji, Kerala, India (in diocesan records Mary Immaculate Church, Cheloor). The church follows leadership by Syro-Malabar Catholic Church under Syro-Malabar Catholic Diocese of Irinjalakuda.

Overview 
Parish  :  Cheloor
Forane  :  Irinjalakuda
Patron  :  Mary Immaculate
First Church :  1879
Consecration of First Church  :  1880
Cemetery  :  1915
Parish Priest Home  :  1917
Consecration New Church  :  22.12.1996
Religious Houses  :  2
Priests  :  1
Male Religious  :  2
Female Religious  :  10
Catholic Population  :  2800
Catholic Families  :  525
Family Units  :  18

Worship time 
Daily Mass : 6:30AM (Mon - Sat)
Sunday : 6:30 AM, 11:30AM

Neighbour parishes 
St. Thomas Cathedral Irinjalakuda
Our Lady of Dollars Irinjalakuda West (Thanisserry)
St Antony's Church Paduva Nagar (Ikkarakunnu)
St Sebastian Church Edakkulam
St Marys's Church Padiyoor
St Joseph's Syrian Church Mathilakam
St Joseph's Latin Church Mathilakam
St Joseph's Church Kaipamangalam
Our Lady of Carmel Church Aripalam

Chapels 
Mary Immaculate Grotto (inside compound)
Mary Immaculate Grotto (main road view)
Fathima Matha Chapel, Kandeswaram
St. George Chapel, near Church Road
St. Antony's Chappel, Edathirinji
St. Joseph Chapel, Americankettu North West
Sacred Heart Chapel, Chelookavu
St. Sebastian Chapel, Kattikulam
St. Antony's Chapel, Edakulam Road
St. Alphonsa Chapel, Pothany Road

Governance 
Edavaka Prathinidhi Yogam
Kudumbasammelana Kendra Samithi

Kudumbasammelana units 
Little Flower
St. Sebastian
Dollars
Lourd Matha
St. John
Holy Angels
Don Bosco
St. James
St. Mathew
St. Alphonsa
Pavanathma
St. Vincent De Paul
St. Mary's
St. George

Catholic organisations 
C.L.C
Altar Boys
Gayaka Sangham (Choir)
Catholic Youth Movement C.Y.M
Catholic Movement
Jesus Youth
St. Vincent De Paul Society
Franciscan Almaya Sabha
Mathru Sangam
Vanitha Commission

Institutions 
St Mary's L.P. School Edathirinji: Lower Primary School under CMC Sisters. Here learning in both Malayalam and English medium in Kerala State Syllabus

Religious houses in the parish 
Jayamatha Convent: Monastery of CMC Sisters
Bethsaida Bhavan: Old aged home in the boundary of St Mary's Church Cheloor. Malabar Missionary Brothers (MMB) doing this job.

Fathers, brothers and sisters from parish 
Fr. Joseph Cheruvathur
Br.Paulose Arimbuparambil MMB
Sr.Stephin CMC

Former vicars 
After New Church Building
Fr.Joseph Maliyekal
Dr. Antony Manjaly
Fr.Raphel Puthenveettil
Fr.Varghese Perinjeril V.C
Fr. Johny Menachery
Fr.Martin Payyappilly CMI (Acting)
Dr. Joji Palamattah
Fr. Joy Puthenveettil
Fr.Benny Kizhakkeyil CST (Acting)
Fr. Joby Kachappilly CMI (Acting)
Fr.Dr. Davis Chenginiyadan

Mass times 
Sunday 6.30 a.m Adoration 7.00 a.m Holy Mas 10.30 Holy Mass
Mon-Wed & Sat 6.30 a.m Holy Mass
Thursday 5.00 p.m Holy Mass
First Saturday 5.00 p.m Holy Mass & Novena in Grotto

Communication details 
Vicar
St Marys Church Cheloor
Edathirinji P.O.
Kerala, India.
Pin # 680121.
Tel # 0091 480 2820865
Official Web Site : http://www.cheloorchurch.com
Blog : http://www.smccheloor.blogspot.com

References 

http://www.sahrdayatech.com/irdiocese/parishes.php?&thisrow=1

https://web.archive.org/web/20100412112326/http://www.irinjalakudadiocese.com/parishes.htm

External links 
http://stmaryschurchcheloor.ning.com/ Join Our Own Social Community Site

Irinjalakuda
Churches in Thrissur district
Syro-Malabar Catholic church buildings
Eastern Catholic churches in Kerala
1880 establishments in India
Churches completed in 1880